Jon Lukas (11 September 1948 – 11 June 2021), known as Woodenman, was a Maltese musician from Paola, Malta. He was the first solo artist in Maltese music history to achieve successful foreign pop chart placements in a number of non-native countries and to obtain a major global record company deal.

Career
Jon’s record “Can’t Afford To Lose”, composed by Gary Benson, released in 1970, became an international hit.   “Apart from making it to the Top 40 charts in some European territories, “Can't Afford To Lose” occupied the top place in the pop charts in Lebanon for a full month, holding back The Beatles' “The Long and Winding Road” from reaching the No.1 spot.

In 1993, Lukas, accompanied by Marita, placed second in that year's Malta Song Festival with his own composition “Żommni u Għannaqni”.  This was the first time that Lukas sang in his native Maltese language. The English version of this song, entitled “The Love We Share”, was produced by Indian-British music producer Biddu.

In 1998, Jon formed the band “Woodenman”. They recorded an album which topped the “Peoplesound” charts throughout  August 1999”. They had gigs in Barcelona and Madrid.  When they disbanded, Lukas incorporated the band's name and became known as Jon Lukas Woodenman.

On 15 April 2009, Lukas started off a radio programme entitled “Woodenman’s Jukebox” on Malta’s One Radio.  This programme is still being transmitted on U.K.'s Channel Radio.

In the summer of 2008, Marc Storace of Krokus paid tribute to Lukas' 'Can't Afford to Lose'. During his concert, on the island of Gozo, Lukas surprised the audience as he emerged to sing the last half of the song in duet with Storace.

After a long illness, Jon died on 11 June 2021.

Discography

References

External links
 

20th-century Maltese male singers
20th-century Maltese singers
Maltese pop singers
1948 births
2021 deaths
People from Paola, Malta
21st-century Maltese male singers
21st-century Maltese singers